Phil Frank (March 27, 1943 – September 13, 2007) was an American cartoonist best known as the creator of the San Francisco-based comic strip Farley and the artist on nationally syndicated comic strip The Elderberries.

Works
In addition to his Farley comic strip, Frank collaborated with writer Joe Troise on several  comic strip projects:
 Chateau Defeat (published in the Wine Spectator)
 Miles to Go
 Nigel Shiftright, Automotive Anachronism for Road & Track magazine
 The eponymous Frank and Troise also for Road & Track magazine.  
 A series of "Teletoons" for Network World magazine.

Career
Frank started cartooning at Michigan State University first by creating illustrations on classmates jackets and then with the university newspaper for $5 a strip. After graduation and marriage he took a job as an illustrator and humorist with Hallmark Cards in Kansas City, where his son Philip was born. Frank returned to teach at Michigan State for a few years, during which time his daughter Stacy was born. After moving to the Bay Area California in 1973, Frank was an illustrator for a variety of clients including the US Army. He started his now famous syndicated comic strip Travels with Farley while he and his second wife, Susan, lived on a house boat in Sausalito, on San Francisco Bay. During this time his studio was in a pilot's cabin atop a ferry boat docked nearby. When Farley transitioned from a syndicated to a local strip in the San Francisco Chronicle, Frank secured a secret studio atop the Chronicle building where he could covertly create his characters.

Other Works and Interests
In addition to his comic strip work, Frank also worked as an illustrator on many projects during his career on education materials for conservation ("Aunt Energina," the "Electric Gnus,").  He had numerous commercial freelance clients, including the San Francisco Giants and Pet Food Express. He also created some of the first computer-based clip art, and one of his cartoon bears from Asphalt State Park was sold for many years as a popular stuffed animal at California's State Parks alongside his Farley books.

Frank was well known in his home community of Sausalito and served on its Historical Society.

An avid classic car enthusiast since a child, Frank over the years restored an Alfa Romeo 2000 GTV, seven Ford Model As, two MG TCs, an MG SA Tickford Drophead, and a Jaguar MKII. His second wife, Susan, collaborated as writer on several of his publishing projects including children's books. In the summer of 1976 he, along with his wife Susan and the two children, drove a 1929 Model A Four Door pulling a period appropriate camper from California to Maine and back all along the back roads of America.

Retirement and death
Frank announced his retirement for health reasons on September 7, 2007  and died shortly thereafter in Bolinas, California.  Frank had been suffering from a brain tumor for months prior to and was gravely ill at the time of the announcement.

References

External links
 Official Website
 Farley, the comic strip.
 Biography from the San Francisco Chronicle
 Phil Frank Dies
 Phil Frank Retires
 Don Asmussen remembers Phil Frank
 Memorial Page
 Daughter's Website
 Elderberries comic strip

1943 births
2007 deaths
Deaths from brain cancer in the United States
American comic strip cartoonists
Artists from Pittsburgh
People from the San Francisco Bay Area
Deaths from cancer in California
Neurological disease deaths in California
Michigan State University alumni
Hallmark Cards artists